Ceylon Railway Engineer Corps was a departmental corps of the Ceylon Defense Force from 1943 to 1945 and of the Ceylon Volunteer Force 1955 to 1956 consisting of staff from the Ceylon Government Railway. The government hoped to minimized the effects to the Post and Telegraph services in the event of trade union action (strikes were common) by mobilizing the personnel attached to this unit. However it was disbanded in 1956 when the leftist S.W.R.D. Bandaranaike became prime minister.

Disbanded regiments of the Sri Lankan Army
Military units and formations established in 1955
Military units and formations disestablished in 1956
1955 establishments in Ceylon
1956 disestablishments in Ceylon
Sri Lanka Army Volunteer Force